John Holsgrove (born 27 September 1945) is an English former professional footballer who played as a central defender. Active in the Football League between 1964 and 1976, Holsgrove made over 300 career appearances.

Career
Holsgrove began his youth career at Tottenham Hotspur, as an amateur, before moving to Crystal Palace's junior programme. He signed professional terms in February 1964 and made 18 appearances in the Football League during the 1964–65 season, scoring twice. Holsgrove signed for Wolverhampton Wanderers in May 1965 and later played for Sheffield Wednesday and Stockport County, making a total of 311 appearances in the League. He also played non-League football for Stalybridge Celtic.

Personal life
His three sons - Paul, Lee and Peter - were also all footballers, as is grandson Jordan (son of Paul).

References

External links

1945 births
Living people
English footballers
Association football defenders
Tottenham Hotspur F.C. players
Crystal Palace F.C. players
Wolverhampton Wanderers F.C. players
Sheffield Wednesday F.C. players
Stockport County F.C. players
Stalybridge Celtic F.C. players
English Football League players